Ants Piip VR III/1 (also Anton or Hans Piip;  in Tuhalaane, Kreis Fellin – 1 October 1942 in Nyrobsky camp, Perm Oblast, Russian SFSR) was an Estonian lawyer, diplomat and politician. Piip was the 1st Head of State of Estonia and the 5th Prime Minister of Estonia. Piip played a key role in internationalising the independence aspirations of Estonia during the Paris Peace Conference following World War I.

Education
Son of a small independent farmer, Piip took his high school exams at the Kuressaare State High School and studied at Teachers' Seminar in Kuldīga (formerly Goldingen), now in Latvia. In 1903–1905, he was a parish clerk and schoolteacher at Alūksne, also a teacher in the Emperor Nikolai Eastern Orthodox Parish School in Kuressaare in 1905–1906, in the Kuressaare Marine School in 1906–1912, and in the Janson Merchant School in Saint Petersburg in 1913–1915. He studied at the law department of the Saint Petersburg University in 1908–1913 and received a scientific scholarship from the Saint Petersburg University in 1913–1916, during that time he worked in the Russian Justice and Interior Ministries. Piip took additional courses in the Berlin University in 1912.

Career
Piip was a member of the Estonian Province Assembly, and later a member of the Constituent Assembly (Asutav Kogu), and after that, of the Riigikogu. In 1917–1919, Piip was a member of the Estonian Foreign Mission in Saint Petersburg and in London, he participated in the Paris Peace Conference. In 1919 he was Deputy to the Minister of Foreign Affairs, 1919–1920 Member of the Estonian delegation in the Tartu peace negotiations between Estonia and the Russian SFSR. In 1919–1940 he was Professor of International Law in Tartu University. In 1920, he was the diplomatic representative the Republic of Estonia in Great Britain. 1920–1921, while Head of State, Piip was also the Minister of War. He held position of Minister of Foreign Affairs five times, also he was in 1923–1925 the Envoy of Estonia to the United States of America. During 1938–1940, Piip was also member of the Riigivolikogu (first chamber of the Riigikogu).

Piip was arrested by the NKVD on 30 June 1941 and he died in a Soviet prison camp NyrobLag the next year.

Quote
Ants Piip, in 1934 in Riga, emphasised the importance of regional co-operation in preserving Baltic independence:

Awards
 1920 – Cross of Liberty III/I
 1926 – Order of the Three Stars I (Latvia)
 1932 – Order of the Estonian Red Cross I/II
 1934 – Order of the Cross of the Eagle I
 1940 – Order of the White Star I

References

Citations

Bibliography

 
 Ants Piip
 Ülo Kaevats et al. 2000. Eesti Entsüklopeedia, volume 14. Tallinn: Eesti Entsüklopeediakirjastus,

External links

1884 births
1942 deaths
People from Mulgi Parish
People from Kreis Fellin
Eastern Orthodox Christians from Estonia
Estonian Radical Socialist Party politicians
Estonian Labour Party politicians
National Centre Party (Estonia) politicians
Heads of State of Estonia
Prime Ministers of Estonia
Defence Ministers of Estonia
Ministers of Foreign Affairs of Estonia
Members of the Estonian Provincial Assembly
Members of the Estonian Constituent Assembly
Members of the Riigikogu, 1920–1923
Members of the Estonian National Assembly
Members of the Riigivolikogu
Envoys of Estonia
Academic staff of the University of Tartu
Recipients of the Cross of Liberty (Estonia)
Recipients of the Military Order of the Cross of the Eagle, Class I
Recipients of the Order of the White Star, 1st Class
People who died in the Gulag
Estonian people who died in prison custody
Estonian people who died in Soviet detention